Muhammad Ibn Abdullah Taleb Amoli known as Talib Amuli and Talib Amoli (also aka Ashub, Atash, Taleba and Malek Al Shoara Taleb) (b. Mazandaran 1586 - d. India 1627) Iranian Tabari poet was of the early 17th century. He was the poet laureate of the Mughal emperor Jahangir from 1618 till his death. His poetry is in the “Indian Style” of Persian language. 
A poetry collection (divan) and the poem Talib and Zohre are the works that are left of him today. The fact that he read mathematics, geometry and philosophy in his poems reveals that he received a good education. He is also known to be a good calligrapher.
Around 1010 AH, he traveled from Amol to Isfahan and from there to Kashan. After Kashan, the Taleb goes to Mashhad and from there to Marv to serve Bektash Khan. This ruler receives Taleb with respect. But the poet always dreamed of going to India, so he leaves for India. He for some time he lived in Delhi, then in Agra. In the end he ended up at the court of Mirza Ghazi Beg, the Mughal governor of Kandahar.

Taleb played a crucial role in the rapid transformation of poetic style at the beginning of the 17th century. His work gave a free rein to the tendency toward conceptualism (Fantasy) in the “fresh style” (later known as the Indian Style) that had begun to emerge a generation earlier in the poetry of Naẓiri and ʿOrfi. At the same time, he gave a new vitality to conventional images and common idioms by exploring their full figurative implications, a procedure Taleb himself revealingly dubs his ṭarz-e esteʿāre (metaphorical style). Taleb entered Jahangir’s service about 1616 and was appointed to the post of poet laureate (Malek osh-Sho'ara) in 1619. His Ghazal poems are very similar to Hafez.

Taleb after poets Ferdowsi and Omar Khayyam, is the third poet in terms of the number of verses among Iranian poets. Taleb, the number of couplets in the published complex is approaching 23,000.  Taleb was buried in the compound of the Taj Mahal at Shah Jahan command when he died. Taleb gravesite is unknown.

Poem
ما به استقبال غم کشور به کشور می‌رویم        چون ز پا محروم می‌مانیم با سر می‌رویم

صد ره این ره رفته‌ایم و بار دیگر می‌رویم          العطش‌گویان به استقبال ساغر می‌رویم

چون به پا رفتن میسر نیست ما را سوی دوست      نامه می‌گردیم و با بالِ کبوتر می‌رویم

کنون کز مو به مویم اضطراب تازه می‌ریزد             نسیمی گر وزد اوراقم از شیرازه می‌ریزد

لب عیشم به هر عمری نوایی می‌زند اما               زبان شیونم هردم هزار آوازه می‌ریزد

دلی دارم که در آغوش مرهم زخم ناسورش           نمک می‌گوید و خمیازه بر خمیازه می‌ریزد

عجب گر نقشبندی‌های صبر ما درست آید          که عشق این طرح بی‌پرگار، بی‌اندازه می‌ریزد

See also

List of Persian poets and authors
Persian literature

Notes
 The Elements of Semantic Ambiguity in the Poetry of Talib Amoli
 Faculty of Literature and Human Sciences - literature.ut.ac
 Network Comprehensive Book Gisoom

References

17th-century Persian-language poets
People from Amol
1580 births
1626 deaths
Iranian emigrants to the Mughal Empire
Persian literature
Iranian male poets
Iranian emigrants to India
Iranian calligraphers
17th-century Iranian mathematicians